Journal of Surgery may refer to

Journal of Surgery (OMICS Publishing Group journal), published by OMICS Publishing Group
Journal of Surgery (Science Publishing Group journal), published by Science Publishing Group